While there is no Official Opposition in Holyrood, Douglas Ross, as leader of the largest party not in government, he acts as the Leader of the Opposition. Ross was appointed leader of the Scottish Conservatives in August 2020, but was not a member of the Scottish Parliament, so Ruth Davidson served as the opposition leader until he was elected in the May 2021 election.

Ross appointed his first Shadow Cabinet on 11 August 2020, which was led by Davidson. After his election to the parliament in the 2021 election, he made a reshuffle of his existing cabinet, which he then led.

First Shadow Cabinet (2020–2021)

Second Shadow Cabinet (2021–present)

References 

British shadow cabinets
Scottish shadow cabinets